Jouko Autero Award is a yearly award for the Best Finnish ice hockey reporter/journalist etc.

Winners:

 1978 Antero Karapalo
 1979 Jyrki Laelma
 1980 Kaarlo Sundell
 1981 Timo Nyholm
 1982 Raimo Häyrinen
 1983 Iltalehti sports
 1984 Kaleva sports
 1985 Turun Sanomat sports
 1986 Timo Mustonen
 1987 Pekka Wallenius
 1988 Kari Tyni
 1989 Reijo Suikki, Iltalehti
 1990 TV3—Hockey Night team
 1991 Helsingin Sanomat
 1992 Ari Mennander
 1993 Timo Lainesalo, Hämeen Sanomat
 1994 Juha-Pekka Jalo (aka: JP-Jalo)
 1995 YLE Radio Suomi
 1996 Ilkka Ala-Kivimäki, Ilta-Sanomat
 1997 Rauno Harju
 1998 Juha Alanen
 1999 Tapani Salo, Aamulehti
 2000 Hannu Kauhala, Kiekkolehti
 2001 Jussi Heimo, Jääkiekkolehti
 2002 MTV3 -- Hockey Night team (Timo Jutila, Jari Kurri & Mika Saukkonen)
 2003 Jouko Vuorijoki, Kaleva
 2004 YLE Sport's Kiekkokierros Team
 2005 Göran Stubb
 2006 - 2008 Prize not awarded
 2009 Juho Pekka Mikola, Jääkiekkolehti
 2010 Ilkka Kulmala, Keskisuomalainen
 2011 Marko Leppänen, Länsi-Suomi
 2012 Pasi Mennander, Leijonat
 2013 Antti Mäkinen, Nelonen
 2014 Satakunnan Kansa sports
 2015 Mikko Pylkkö, Jatkoaika
 2016 Marko Lempinen, Ilta-Sanomat
 2017 Wesa Koistinen, Savon Sanomat
 2018 Sami Hoffrén, Ilta-Sanomat

Liiga trophies and awards